Ernest W. "Chick" Choukalos (February 11, 1927 – February 20, 1993) was a Canadian football player who played for the Calgary Stampeders, Saskatchewan Roughriders and BC Lions. He also played minor league baseball in the United States.

References

1927 births
1993 deaths
Players of Canadian football from Alberta
Canadian football ends
Calgary Stampeders players
Saskatchewan Roughriders players
BC Lions players
People from Drumheller
Baseball people from Alberta
Canadian expatriate baseball players in the United States
Vancouver Capilanos players
Pocatello Bannocks players
Redding Browns players
Aberdeen Pheasants players
Albuquerque Dukes players
Tucson Cowboys players